Kaneshkin (also Romanized as Kaneshkīn, Kaneshgīn, and Kanishkīn; also known as Kereshkin, Kashgīn, and Kīshkīn) is a village in Qaqazan-e Gharbi Rural District, in the Central District of Takestan County, Qazvin Province, Iran. At the 2006 census, its population was 1,705, in 387 families.

References 

Populated places in Takestan County